The Exchequer Secretary to the Treasury is a junior ministerial post in His Majesty's Treasury, ranked below the First Lord of the Treasury, the Chancellor of the Exchequer, the Chief Secretary to the Treasury, the Paymaster General and the Financial Secretary to the Treasury, and alongside the Economic Secretary to the Treasury. It ranks at Parliamentary Secretary level and is not a Cabinet office. Unlike the other posts of Secretary to the Treasury, it is only used occasionally, normally when the post of Paymaster General is allocated to a minister outside the Treasury.

The first Exchequer Secretary was Phillip Oppenheim, who held the post from 23 July 1996 to 2 May 1997, when he lost his seat in the general election that brought Tony Blair to power. After a period of abeyance, the office was reinstated upon Gordon Brown's accession as Prime Minister in June 2007, when Angela Eagle was appointed Exchequer Secretary. The position was held by Helen Whately, having been held by Kemi Badenoch from 2020 to 2021.

The minister is shadowed by the Shadow Exchequer Secretary to the Treasury, who sits on the Official Opposition frontbench.

Responsibilities
HM Treasury

 Enterprise and productivity including small business taxation and support to the Chancellor of the Exchequer on economic reform
 Competition and better regulation
 Science, innovation and skills policy, including implementation of the 10-year science and innovation strategy and the R&D tax credit
 Regional economic policy
 Urban regeneration and social exclusion including housing, planning and planning gain supplement;
 Environmental issues including taxation of transport, international Climate Change issues including global carbon trading and EU ETS, and Energy Issues
 Taxation of oil
 Excise duties and gambling, including excise fraud and law enforcement
 Public-private partnerships including Private Finance Initiative, and Partnerships UK
 Ministerial responsibility for the Office for National Statistics, the Royal Mint and Departmental Minister for HM Treasury Group
 Support to the Chief Secretary to the Treasury on public spending issues including long-term challenges in the run up to the Comprehensive Spending Review and selected Cabinet Committees
 Assist where necessary on European issues
 Working with the Financial Secretary to the Treasury on the Finance Bill

Responsibility for procurement policy and the former Office of Government Commerce was transferred to the Cabinet Office in 2011.

List of Exchequer Secretaries

References

See also
Secretary to the Treasury

Lists of government ministers of the United Kingdom
1996 establishments in the United Kingdom